Sterie Diamandi (August 22, 1897 – June 11, 1981) was an Ottoman-born Romanian biographer and essayist.

He was born into an Aromanian family in Metsovo, a town that formed part of the Ottoman Empire's Manastir Vilayet and is now in Greece. His father, Vasile Diamandi-Aminceanu, advocated on behalf of the Aromanians and published the 1938 study Românii din Peninsula Balcanică. After attending primary school in his native town, he went to Romanian-language high schools in Thessaloniki, Ioannina, Bitola and Bucharest. He attended the literature and philosophy faculty of Bucharest University, where he was president of the Macedonian students' association and graduated magna cum laude in 1922. Diamandi taught school in Turnu Severin, Roman, Iași and Bucharest. His contributions appeared in the Iași Almanahul Școlii Normale "Vasile Lupu", as well as in Gândul vremii, Minerva and Vremea școlii. His first publication, the 1923 study Contribuția aromânilor în literatura neogreacă, was published in Peninsula Balcanică magazine. His first book was Galeria oamenilor politici (1935), followed by Eroii revoluției ruse (1937), Galeria dictatorilor (1938), Oameni și aspecte din istoria aromânilor (1940), Fiul lui Dumnezeu – Fiul Omului (vol. I-III, 1942-1943) and Arca lui Noe. Together with several other authors, he wrote an Abecedar (primer) in 1932.

Notes

1897 births
1981 deaths
Romanian people of Aromanian descent
Emigrants from the Ottoman Empire to Romania
University of Bucharest alumni
Aromanian schoolteachers
Romanian schoolteachers
Aromanian academics
Romanian essayists
Romanian biographers
20th-century essayists